A.S. Pistoia Basket 2000, known for sponsorship reasons as OriOra Pistoia, is an Italian professional basketball team based in Pistoia, Tuscany.

History
The city of Pistoia was formerly represented in the first division LBA by Olimpia Basket Pistoia during the 1990s.
Pistoia Basket 2000 was promoted to the LBA in 2014, and is playing in that league as of the 2015–16 season.

The 2019–20 season was cancelled prematurely because of the COVID-19 pandemic. In June 2020, Pistoia asked to be repositioned to the second-tier Serie A2.

Players

Current roster

Notable players
- Set a club record or won an individual award as a professional player.
- Played at least one official international match for his senior national team at any time.

 Ariel Filloy
 Davide Moretti
 Giacomo Galanda
 Daniele Magro
 Guido Rosselli
 Gregor Fucka
 Andrea Crosariol
 Valerio Amoroso
 Fabio Mian
 Patrik Auda
 Yakhouba Diawara
 Carl Wheatle
 Teddy Okereafor
 Janis Porzingis
 Aleksander Czyz
 Wayne Blackshear
 Ed Daniel
 Joseph Forte
 Linton Johnson
 Kyle Gibson
 Jamon Gordon
 Antonio Graves
 Langston Hall
 Dwight Hardy
 Michael Jenkins
 JaJuan Johnson
 Bobby Jones
 Alex Kirk
 Jerry McCullough
 Tyrus McGee
 Landon Milbourne
 Ronald Moore
 Jake Odum
 L.J. Peak
 Jarvis Varnado
 Brad Wanamaker
 Deron Washington
 C.J. Williams

Season by season

Trophies
LegaDue
Winners (1): 2012–13

Sponsorship names
Throughout the years, due to sponsorship, the club has been known as:
Cassa di Risparmio Pistoia (2002–05)
Associazione Vivaisti Pistoiesi (2005–06)
Power Dry Pistoia (2006–07)
Carmatic Pistoia (2007–10)
Tuscany Pistoia (2010–11)
Giorgio Tesi Group Pistoia (2011–2016)
The Flexx Pistoia (2016–2018)
OriOra Pistoia (2018–present)

References

External links 
 Official site
 Serie A profile  Retrieved 23 August 2015

2000 establishments in Italy
Basketball teams established in 2000
Basketball teams in Tuscany
Pistoia